Sandra "Sandy" Rucker (born October 29, 1987 in Palm Springs, California), is a former competitive American figure skater. She was the 2005 U.S. national junior champion. Rucker was coached by Tammy Gambill.

Rucker was one of four figure skaters featured on the 2006 TLC series, Ice Diaries. She was also one of Michelle Trachtenberg's skating doubles in the movie Ice Princess. On June 27, 2007, Disney announced that Rucker would play the role of  Sharpay Evans in Disney's High School Musical: The Ice Tour.

Results

References

1987 births
Living people
American female single skaters
Figure skating reality television participants
21st-century American women